Autochloris flavipes is a moth of the subfamily Arctiinae. It was described by Max Wilhelm Karl Draudt in 1915. It is found in Colombia.

References

Arctiinae
Moths described in 1915
Moths of South America